Yassine Trabelsi (born 12 July 1990) is a Tunisian taekwondo athlete.

Career 
He represented Tunisia at the 2016 Summer Olympics in Rio de Janeiro, in the men's +80 kg.

References

External links
 

1990 births
Living people
Tunisian male taekwondo practitioners
Olympic taekwondo practitioners of Tunisia
Taekwondo practitioners at the 2016 Summer Olympics
African Games gold medalists for Tunisia
African Games medalists in taekwondo
African Games silver medalists for Tunisia
Competitors at the 2011 All-Africa Games
Competitors at the 2015 African Games
21st-century Tunisian people